USS LST-872 was an LST-542-class tank landing ship in the United States Navy. Like many of her class, she was not named and is properly referred to by her hull designation.

Operational history 
LST-872 was laid down on 18 November 1944 at Jeffersonville, Indiana, by the Jeffersonville Boat & Machinery Co.; launched on 28 December 1944; sponsored by Mrs. Carrie I. Morris; and commissioned on 22 January 1945.

LST-872 performed no combat service with the United States Navy and was decommissioned on 8 July 1946 and struck from the Navy list on 15 August that same year. On 27 October 1947, she was sold to the Northwest Merchandising Service, renamed Doña Micaela and transferred to Argentina.

Argentine service 
In Argentine Navy service, LST-872 was named ARA Cabo San Gonzalo and redesignated BDT-4 (Buque Desembarco de Tanques), later Q44.  She was retired in 1979.

References

Notes

Bibliography

External links 
  history.navy.mil: USS LST-872
  navsource.org: USS LST-872

 

LST-542-class tank landing ships
World War II amphibious warfare vessels of the United States
Ships built in Jeffersonville, Indiana
1944 ships
LST-542-class tank landing ships of the Argentine Navy